The GAU-19/A (GECAL 50) is an electrically driven, three-barrel rotary heavy machine gun that fires the .50 BMG (12.7×99mm) cartridge.

Technical specifications
The GAU-19/A is designed to accept standard NATO .50 caliber M9-linked ammunition. The rate of fire is selectable to be either 1,000 or 2,000 rounds per minute. The Humvee armament kit version fires at 1,300 rounds per minute. The average recoil force when firing is 1.7 kN,  2.2 kN or 2.8 kN depending on firing rate. In January 2012, General Dynamics announced they would be delivering a new version designated GAU-19/B. It provides the same firepower in a lighter platform, weighing  and optimized for a firing rate of 1,300 rounds per minute and an average recoil force of 2.5 kN. Both variants can be configured for an ammunition capacity of 500–1,200 rounds. Both variants are reliable to 40,000 mean rounds between failure.

History

The GECAL 50 was first manufactured by General Electric, then by Lockheed Martin, and now by General Dynamics. Design work began in 1982. Early prototypes had six barrels, but a three-barreled configuration is now standard. The GAU-19/A was originally designed as a larger, more potent version of the M134 Minigun. Due to the loss of nine helicopters in Grenada, GE started building prototypes of the weapon in both a three-barreled and a six-barreled configuration. The six-barreled version was designed to fire 4,000 rounds per minute, and could be adapted to fire up to 8,000 rounds per minute. The GAU-19 takes 0.4 seconds to reach maximum firing rate. Soon it was recommended as a potential armament for the V-22 Osprey. The magazine would be located underneath the cabin floor and could be reloaded in-flight. However, plans to mount the gun were later dropped. In December 1992 the US Navy issued a letter of qualification for GAU-19/A integration and use on naval aircraft. In 2005, the GAU-19/A was approved to be mounted on the OH-58D Kiowa helicopter. It also could have been used on the Army's now cancelled ARH-70.

In 1999, the United States sent 28 GAU-19s to Colombia. Oman is known to use the GAU-19/A mounted on their HMMWVs. The Mexican Navy uses MDH MD-902 series helicopters with the GAU-19/A system mounted for anti-narcotics operations.

In October 2010 General Dynamics began developing the lighter weight GAU-19/B in response to an urgent needs statement issued by the Armed Scout Helicopter Program Office. By April 2011 flight testing had begun and by January 2012, the U.S. Army ordered 30 GAU-19/B versions for use on helicopters. All were delivered by the next month. In August 2012 the GAU-19/B received a safety confirmation from the US Army Evaluation Center for use on the OH-58D Kiowa Warrior.

Both GAU-19 variants have been integrated on naval vessels (tripod and remote weapons station), vehicles (turret and remotely operated), and on both rotary and fixed wing aircraft (externally mounted under wing fixed forward and man fired from the aircraft door or cargo ramp). Most recently a self-contained gun pod was developed by Fulcrum Concepts LLC 

Turkish made Aselsan STAMP-G stabilized weapon station can be fitted with a GAU-19/A.

Users
: Used by Drug Enforcement troops, and the Colombian National Police, AH-60L ARPIA III/IV COIN attack helicopter, AC-47 T CAS gunship

: Used by Japan Coast Guard, on PC Kagayuki class
: Used by the Mexican Air Force and the Mexican Navy on Humvees, UH-60 Black Hawks, and the MD Explorer
: Used on Army HMMWV.
: 12 GAU-19B 
: Used on AH6i
: 4 GAU-19/B for use on AH6i 

: Used on S70M Blackhawks, Bell 407 and naval vessels and HMMWVs.

See also

Notes

References

External links
General Dynamics Ordnance and Tactical Systems GAU-19/A page
General Dynamics Ordnance and Tactical Systems GAU-19/B page
GAU-19 Gatling Gun Video
List of Military Gatling & Revolver cannons
Information at Navy weapons

Aircraft guns
Multi-barrel machine guns
.50 BMG machine guns
Machine guns of the United States
Military equipment introduced in the 1980s